Craugastor greggi is a species of frog in the family Craugastoridae.
It is found in Guatemala and Mexico.
Its natural habitats are subtropical or tropical moist montane forests and rivers.
It is threatened by habitat loss.

References

greggi
Amphibians of Guatemala
Amphibians of Mexico
Amphibians described in 1955
Taxonomy articles created by Polbot